Marion St John Adcock Webb (5 December 1888 – 2 May 1930) was an English writer of novels and poetry for children that presaged A. A. Milne, with her character "The Littlest One".

Life
She was born in Hampstead on 5 December 1888, the daughter of the poet Arthur St John Adcock and Marlon Louise Taylor. She grew up at 42 Paddington Street and was admitted to St Marylebone School in Marylebone in January 1894, having just turned 5 years old.

Webb wrote poems for a series of fairy books illustrated by Margaret Tarrant, with whom she worked on around 20 books. The treatment of childhood by Tarrant and Webb is now regarded as sentimentalised, typical of its time. She had no children of her own, She died 2 May 1930 in London. 

Her work is also considered ahead of its time with entries into fantasy parallel worlds, depictions of strong female leads, and includes intense characterisations of people considered on the margins of society. Good copies of Little Round House change hands for £100s of pounds in the specialist book trade.

Partial bibliography

 Mr Papingay's Flying Shop
 Mr Papingay's Ship
 Mr Papingay's Caravan
 Mr Papingay and the Little Round House
 The Little Round House
 The Little One In Between
 Eliz'beth, Phil and Me
 The Littlest One
 The Littlest One Again
 The Littlest One: His Book
 The Littlest One: Third Book
 John, Me and the Dickery Dog
 The Magic Lamplighter
 The House with the Twisting Passage
 Knock Three Times! (1917, fantasy novel, illustrated by Tarrant, repub. 1994 by Wordsworth Editions Ltd, reprint. 2007)
 A Pocketful of Posies
 The Littlest Fairy
 The Girls of Chequertrees
 Adventures at Chequertrees
 Jonathan Mends the Mats
 The 'Normous Sunday Story Book

Fairies series

 The Pond Fairies
 Heath Fairies
 Seashore Fairies
 Weather Fairies
 Wild Fruit Fairies
 Twilight Fairies
 Orchard Fairies
 Forest Fairies
 Flower Fairies
 Insect Fairies
 Seed Fairies
 House Fairies
 Water Fairies

References

External links

 
 
 
 

1888 births
1930 deaths
English women poets
English children's writers
20th-century English poets
20th-century English women writers
Children's poets
People from Marylebone
Writers from London